The 2014 GP Miguel Induráin was the 61st edition of the GP Miguel Induráin cycle race and was held on 5 April 2014. The race started and finished in Estella. The race was won by Alejandro Valverde.

General classification

References

2014
2014 UCI Europe Tour
2014 in Spanish road cycling